Anna McGahan (born 2 May 1988) is an Australian actress and playwright, who has appeared in Australian television, film and theatre.

She is best known for playing the roles of Nellie Cameron in the Australian television series, Underbelly: Razor (2011), Lucy in House Husbands (2012-2014), and Rose Anderson in The Doctor Blake Mysteries (2015-2018).

She received the Queensland Young Playwright's Award in 2008 and 2009, and was short-listed for the Queensland Premier's Drama Award in 2010, for her play 'He's Seeing Other People Now'. She co-wrote the immersive theatre piece 'The People of the Sun' with Joel McKerrow, which toured Melbourne and Sydney in 2016 and 2017.

In 2016 she was shortlisted for The Saturday Paper's national essay award, the Horne Prize.

Career

McGahan has appeared in Australian film, television and theatre. Her most notable appearance to date is starring as Nellie Cameron in the hit Australian TV series Underbelly: Razor, in which she plays a 16-year-old 1920s prostitute from a wealthy background who influenced some of the era's most powerful men, for which she won the Inside Film 'Out of the Box' Award and was nominated for two Logies.

In 2012 she received a 'Best Emerging Artist' Matilda Award for her performance in La Boite Theatre Company's Julius Caesar.

McGahan appeared in the 2012 film 100 Bloody Acres and Australian TV series "House Husbands" on the Nine Network in the same year.

On 27 June 2012, McGahan was awarded the Heath Ledger scholarship at the Australians in Film benefit in Los Angeles.

In 2014 she played Sister Olive Haynes in the six-part miniseries for ABC Television ANZAC Girls. Based closely on real characters, she plays opposite Brandon McClelland as the Australian soldier Norval 'Pat' Dooley, who married Haynes in 1917.

In May 2021, McGahan played Katharina in William Shakespeare's The taming of the shrew with Queensland Theatre (in the Bille Brown Theatre, Brisbane), directed by Damien Ryan.  Petruchio was played by Nicholas Brown.

Personal life

McGahan grew up in Coorparoo, Queensland she went to Brisbane Girls Grammar School located in Brisbane City and studied for a Bachelor of Fine Arts (Acting) at QUT, graduating in 2010. She subsequently relocated to Sydney. Growing up she was a dedicated ballet dancer and then began studying psychology upon finishing high school. She studied screenwriting at AFTRS in 2015.

In 2012 McGahan converted to Christianity while reading a Gideon's Bible in a hotel room, where she had a "series of spiritual encounters". In 2019 her memoir of her spiritual journey was published by Acorn Press, and was nominated for the global ECPA Christian Book Awards. She is no longer heavily involved in the church as an institution, and in 2021 stated that she creates work that ‘prioritises a defiant female gaze to explore experiences of embodiment, motherhood, sexuality and spirituality’.

McGahan is also a playwright.  She won the Queensland Theatre Company Young Playwright's Award in 2009 and 2010, and was shortlisted for the Queensland Premier's Drama Award in 2011. In 2012 she produced her full-length play He's Seeing Other People Now through the Metro Arts Independents Season in Brisbane.

McGahan married Jonathan Weir in April 2017.  They welcomed their first child, Mercy Weir, in February 2018, born prematurely at 33 weeks. They separated in 2021, and she now lives in Brisbane with her two daughters.

Filmography

Film

Television

Awards and nominations

References

Sources
 QUT Queensland University of Technology, Brisbane Australia.
 The Courier Mail - an Australian newspaper
 SMH The Sydney Morning Herald
 The Courier Mail - an Australian newspaper
 The Gatehouse - Studio B
 Marquee

External links
 

Actresses from Brisbane
Australian Protestants
Australian stage actresses
Australian television actresses
Australian film actresses
Converts to Protestantism from atheism or agnosticism
Queensland University of Technology alumni
1988 births
Living people